Rigabad, sometimes rendered as Rik Abad and Rikabad, may refer to:
 Rigabad, Anbarabad, Kerman Province
 Rigabad, Bardsir, Kerman Province
 Rigabad, Fahraj, Kerman Province
 Rigabad, Negin Kavir, Fahraj County, Kerman Province
 Rigabad, Maskun, Jiroft County, Kerman Province
 Rigabad, Manujan, Kerman Province
 Rigabad, Ravar, Kerman Province
 Rigabad, Nehzatabad, Rudbar-e Jonubi County, Kerman Province
 Rigabad, Rudbar, Rudbar-e Jonubi County, Kerman Province
 Rigabad, Eskelabad, Khash County, Sistan and Baluchestan Province
 Rigabad, South Khorasan
 Rigabad, Piranshahr, West Azerbaijan Province
 Rigabad, Salmas, West Azerbaijan Province
 Rigabad, Urmia, West Azerbaijan Province